AG11 may refer to:
Russian submarine AG-11
SR58 (battery)